Afonso Guimarães da Silva, best known as Afonsinho (born in Rio de Janeiro, March 8, 1914 – February 20, 1997), was a Brazilian footballer who played as an attacking midfielder.

During his career (1931–1946), he played for America-RJ, Flamengo, São Cristóvão and Fluminense. He won four Rio de Janeiro State Championships (1931, 1940, 1941, 1946). For the Brazilian team, he played at the 1937 South American Championship, scoring one goal, and played four matches in the 1938 FIFA World Cup.

He died at the age of 82.

References

1914 births
1997 deaths
Brazil international footballers
America Football Club (RJ) players
CR Flamengo footballers
Fluminense FC players
Association football midfielders
1938 FIFA World Cup players
Footballers from Rio de Janeiro (city)
Brazilian footballers